Nova 93.7 (call sign: 6PER) is a commercial radio station in Perth, Western Australia. Jointly owned by NOVA Entertainment and Australian Radio Network, it was established in the Perth market on 5 December 2002. Nova 93.7 was launched at 3pm by the Red Hot Chili Peppers and by current drive presenter Tim Blackwell, with "Can't Stop" the first song being aired.

Nova 93.7 is only the second commercial FM radio station in Perth to not have previously been an AM station. The first was ARN's 96fm.

Controversies

Rigged competition
In April 2010, announcer Hans Bruechle tipped off his friend Ashlea Reid when he was about to play the secret song. The radio station was alerted to the rigging by a friend of both Reid and Bruechle. Following the incident Nova gave the prize to youth suicide prevention charity Youth Focus and Bruechle was fired.

Announcers 
 Nathan, Nat & Shaun (Breakfast) 6:00am–9:00am
 Ross Wallman (Mornings) 9:00am–12:00pm
 Ben Carney (Afternoons) 12:00pm–3:00pm
 Ricki-Lee, Tim & Joel (Drive) 3:00pm–6:00pm
 Fitzy & Wippa with Kate Ritchie (Drive) 6:00pm–7:00pm
 Smallzy's Surgery (Nights) 7:00pm–10:00pm
 Mason Tucker (Late Nights Mondays to Thursdays) 10:00pm–1:00am

News 
 Ellie Petricevic (News)
 Michelle Stephenson (National News Manager)

References

External links
 Nova 93.7's homepage
 NOVA Entertainment

Radio stations in Perth, Western Australia
Radio stations established in 2002
Contemporary hit radio stations in Australia
Nova Entertainment
Australian Radio Network